Thin Blue Line is a Swedish police procedural drama television series created by Anagram Sweden which premiered in Sweden on 17 January 2021.

Synopsis
The first season of the series consists of 10 episodes, and follows the private and professional struggles of six police officers working in the multicultural southern Swedish city of Malmö, with more emphasis on their personal drama than crime-driven plot.

In the words of the writer, the series asks the questions "How do you remain a whole human being seeing so much hardship, so many horrid things?... How can I be a hopeful person in this world we live in, with the problems we have?", and shows how the four main characters cope in different ways.

Cast and characters

The main characters are:
 Sara – Amanda Jansson
 Magnus – Oscar Töringe
 Leah – Gizem Erdogan
 Jesse – Per Lasson
Danijela – Sandra Stojiljkovic
Faye – Anna Sise

Production
Mikael Hansson and Anders Hazelius directed six episodes each, across two seasons. Four episodes were directed by Sanna Lenken (who directed My Skinny Sister). Cilla Jackert, lead writer on the series, started writing it in 2014.

The series was made by Anagram Sweden, with Polish company Fixafilm providing digital imaging technician services.

Filming of the season 1 took place between June 2019 and January 2020. A second series has been announced, intended for release in 2022.

Release
The first season of the series premiered in Sweden's SVT on 17 January 2021, followed by the other Scandinavian state broadcasters: Finland's YLE and Norway's NRK later in the month; Iceland's RUV in February; and Denmark's public broadcaster DR in March.

Thin Blue Line is distributed internationally by ITV Studios. It  was released on SBS on Demand in Australia on 1 October 2021, and premiered on SBS Television on 5 April 2022. In Germany it is broadcast by ZDF in July 2022.

A new season is in production, slated for release in 2022.

Awards
The series was entered for the Nordisk Film & TV Fond Prize at the Göteborg Film Festival in 2021.

The series won "Best TV Drama and Best Programme of the year" at the annual Swedish television awards, the Kristallen TV Awards, on 27 August 2021.

References

External links

2021 Swedish television series debuts
Kristallen winners
Swedish-language television shows
Television shows set in Sweden
2020s police procedural television series